The Nordic Marathon Championships was an irregularly-held men's competition over the marathon distance between athletes from the Nordic countries. All five Nordic countries took part in the competitions and all five played host to the tournament, with Iceland being the last nation to do so in 1969. Finland was the most successful nation at the championships, with only two of the race winners coming from elsewhere. The only other countries to reach the medal table were Sweden and Norway.

It was inaugurated in 1949 and was held on a biennial basis until 1959. It was incorporated into the Nordic Athletics Championships for the 1961, 1963 and 1965 editions. The event re-emerged as a separate annual competition alongside the Nordic Combined Events Championships between 1967 and 1970. The last three marathons were held in 1975, 1977 and 1979. Women never featured at the competition as developments in women's athletics had not yet reached the point where marathon races were common.

Veikko Karvonen was the most successful athlete, with three straight victories from 1951 to 1955. Three other Finns managed to top the podium twice: Tenho Salakka, Eino Oksanen and Pentti Rummakko. Rummakko would have matched Karvonen's feat had he been officially selected in 1970 – he finished first in 2:29:34 hours competing as a guest that year. No athletes outside of Finland had an athlete reach the podium on multiple occasions. Finland swept the medals in 1955, 1957, 1959, 1963, 1968, and 1969. Reflecting the success of the Flying Finns period, at least two Finnish athletes stood on the podium at fourteen of the sixteen times the championships was held (Swedes took the minor medals in 1961 and Finland took no medals in 1977). Håkan Spik of Finland set the championships record of 2:14:48 upon winning the final edition in 1979.

A Nordic Marathon Match was held in 2015 in Stockholm. Men and women's individual and team competitions were held. Swedes Fredrik Johansson and Isabellah Andersson won the races and led their nation to both team titles.

Editions

Medal summary

Medal table

See also
Nordic Cross Country Championships

References

Nordic Marathon Championships. GBR Athletics. Retrieved 2018-04-23.

Nordic Athletics competitions
Marathons in Europe
Recurring sporting events established in 1949
Recurring sporting events disestablished in 1979
Defunct athletics competitions